Karen Thomas may refer to:

Karen P. Thomas, composer
J. Karen Thomas, American actress, singer, and voice artist
Karen Thomas (curling) 1998 Scott Tournament of Hearts